Alizapride (Litican, Plitican, Superan, Vergentan) is a dopamine antagonist with prokinetic and antiemetic effects used in the treatment of nausea and vomiting, including postoperative nausea and vomiting. It is  structurally related to metoclopramide and other benzamides.

References 

Antiemetics
Dopamine antagonists
Motility stimulants
Salicylamide ethers
Benzotriazoles
Pyrrolidines
Allyl compounds